George Henry Fox (20 February 1867 – 29 October 1920), later known as George Henry Lane-Fox, was a New Zealand cricketer. He played two first-class matches for Otago between 1888 and 1890.

Fox was born in England at Tredington, Gloucestershire in 1867. He was a doctor and, later in life, changed his surname to Lane-Fox.

References

External links
 

1867 births
1920 deaths
New Zealand cricketers
Otago cricketers
Sportspeople from Gloucestershire